Limnichidae, commonly called minute marsh-loving beetles, is a family of beetles belonging to Byrrhoidea. There are at least 30 genera and 350 described species in Limnichidae. They are found worldwide, with the greatest diversity in tropical regions. Most species seem to be associated with water-adjacent habitats, such as riparian and coastal locations, though many species are likely fully terrestrial, with some species being associated with leaf litter and arboreal habitats. Species with known diets feed on moss or algae. The oldest fossils of the family are known from mid-Cretaceous Burmese amber from Myanmar.

Genera

References

Further reading

 
 
 
 
 
 
 
 
 
 
 

Byrrhoidea
Beetle families